Jennifer S. Brodbelt is an American chemist known for her research using mass spectrometry to characterize organic compounds, especially biopolymers and proteins.

Education and career 
Brodbelt has an undergraduate degree from the University of Virginia and earned her Ph.D. from Purdue University where she worked on gas phase ion chemistry using mass spectrometry. Following her Ph.D. she was a postdoc at the University of California, Santa Barbara before joining the University of Texas at Austin in 1989. As of 2016, she is the Roland Pettit Centennial Chair in the Department of Chemistry. 

She was the president of the American Society for Mass Spectrometry for the period of 2014–2016.

Research 
Brodbelt's research centers on the development of mass spectrometry-based methods to characterize organic molecules. Brodbelt's early research established methods to use chemical ionization in ion trap mass spectrometers and applied this method to the analysis of petroleum samples. She subsequently worked on gas-phase ion chemistry and photodissociation as methods to break apart organic compounds before they are analyzed by a mass spectrometer. Her work has led to the analysis of compounds including recreational drugs, sunscreen, and pesticides. Her work also includes investigations into proteins and other organic compounds produced by bacteria including

Selected publications

Awards 
She was awarded the Agnes Fay Morgan Research Award in 1995. In 2019, Brodbelt received the Frank H. Field and Joe L. Franklin Award for Outstanding Achievement in Mass Spectrometry from the American Chemical Society.

References

External links 
 

Year of birth missing (living people)
Living people
University of Texas at Austin faculty
Purdue University alumni
21st-century American chemists

Mass spectrometrists